Claude Croté (14 April 1938 – 28 July 2013) was a Belgian footballer. He played in one match for the Belgium national football team in 1961.

References

External links
 
 

1938 births
2013 deaths
Belgian footballers
Belgium international footballers
Place of birth missing
Footballers from Namur (province)
Union Royale Namur Fosses-La-Ville players
RFC Liège players